Angela Savage (born 1966) is an Australian author.

Biography 
Savage was born in Melbourne and educated at Siena College, Camberwell. She graduated from the University of Melbourne in 1989 with a BA (Combined Honours) in Criminology and the History and Philosophy of Science. She has worked for the Australian Red Cross in Southeast Asia, 1993–1998; for Sexual Health & Family Planning Australia in the South Pacific, 2000–2002; for the Victorian Council of Social Service, 2002–2007; and for the Association of Neighbourhood Houses and Learning Centres (Melbourne, Victoria), 2009–2014.

Career
Savage won the Victorian Premier's Unpublished Manuscript Award in 2004 for Thai Died. Her first novel, based on this manuscript (Behind the Night Bazaar, Text Publishing, 2006), was shortlisted for the 2007 Ned Kelly Award for Best First Fiction. Her second novel (The Half-Child, Text Publishing, 2010) was shortlisted for the 2011 Ned Kelly Award for Best Fiction. In 2011 she won the Scarlet Stiletto prize for Australian women's short crime fiction, awarded by Sisters in Crime Australia, for 'The Teardrop Tattoos'. Her third novel (The Dying Beach, Text Publishing, 2013) was shortlisted for the 2014 Ned Kelly Award for Best Fiction, and the Sisters in Crime Australia 14th Davitt Awards for Australian Crime Writing by Women (Best Adult Novel). She contributed an essay to the collection, If I Tell You...I'll Have To Kill You: Australia's leading crime writers reveal their secrets (Michael Robotham ed., Allen & Unwin, 2013).

Books 
 Behind the Night Bazaar, Text Publishing, 2006
 The Half-Child, Text Publishing, 2010
 The Dying Beach, Text Publishing, 2013
 Mother of Pearl, Transit Lounge Publishing, 2019

Other
Christos Tsiolkas dedicated his fifth novel, Barracuda (Allen & Unwin, 2013), to Savage.

Notes

External links 
 Angela Savage author website

1966 births
Living people
Australian crime writers
University of Melbourne alumni
Scarlet Stiletto award winners